Sinan Bakış (born 22 April 1994) is a Turkish professional footballer who plays as a forward for FC Andorra in the Spanish Segunda División.

Club career
A Bayer Leverkusen youth graduate, Bakış joined Kayserispor in 2013. He made his Süper Lig debut on 15 September of that year, in a 1–1 draw against Gençlerbirliği.

In 2016, Bakış moved to Bursaspor, but featured sparingly before signing for Admira Wacker in 2018. In 2020, he agreed to a contract with Eredivisie side Heracles Almelo.

Bakış switched teams and countries again on 1 September 2022, after signing a one-year contract with Segunda División newcomers FC Andorra.

International career
Bakış represented Turkey at the 2013 UEFA U-19 Championship and 2013 FIFA U-20 World Cup.

References

External links
 
 
 
 

1994 births
Living people
People from Troisdorf
Sportspeople from Cologne (region)
Footballers from North Rhine-Westphalia
German people of Turkish descent
Association football forwards
Turkish footballers
Turkey under-21 international footballers
Turkey youth international footballers
German footballers
Kayserispor footballers
Bursaspor footballers
FC Admira Wacker Mödling players
Heracles Almelo players
FC Andorra players
Süper Lig players
TFF First League players
Austrian Football Bundesliga players
Eredivisie players
Turkish expatriate footballers
Expatriate footballers in Austria
Expatriate footballers in the Netherlands
Expatriate footballers in Andorra
Turkish expatriate sportspeople in the Netherlands